The 1961 All-Ireland Senior Camogie Championship Final was the thirtieth All-Ireland Final and the deciding match of the 1961 All-Ireland Senior Camogie Championship, an inter-county camogie tournament for the top teams in Ireland.

Tipperary's prospects looked strong at half-time: after playing against the wind with the sun in their eyes, they were only a point down. But Dublin won in end, with Kathleen Mills finishing her career with a record fifteenth All-Ireland medal. Judy Doyle (Dublin) scored a hat-trick.

References

All-Ireland Senior Camogie Championship Final
All-Ireland Senior Camogie Championship Final
All-Ireland Senior Camogie Championship Final, 1961
All-Ireland Senior Camogie Championship Finals
Dublin county camogie team matches